Kutaisi Municipal Assembly (Georgian: ქუთაისის საკრებულო) is a representative body in the city of Kutaisi, Georgia. currently consisting of 35 members; of these, 28 are proportional representatives and 7 are elected through single-member districts, representing their constituencies. It was established in the early 1990s, after Georgia's independence. The council is assembled into session regularly, to consider subject matters such as code changes, utilities, taxes, city budget, oversight of city government and more.  Kutaisi sakrebulo is elected every four years. Currently, the city council has 5 committees. The last election was held in october 2021. The ruling party of “georgian Dream” won the majority of votes. The current Chairperson of Kutaisi city Assembly is Irakli Shengelia

Composition

The members of the Sakrebulo are selected through a mixed electoral system. Of the 35 seats, 7 are filled through direct elections in local districts of the city. The remaining 28 members are chosen by political parties and are apportioned according to their support citywide. From 2017 counsel had 18 members from the ruling Georgian Dream, 14 from the United National Movement, 2 from For Georgia and 1 from Strategy Aghmashenebeli .

Powers

In accordance with the Code of Local Self-Government of the Organic Law of Georgia, the Sakrebulo exercises its powers to define the administrative-territorial organization of the municipality and its identity, organizational activities, determination of the personnel policy of the municipality, regulation and control of the activities of executive bodies; In the fields of municipal property management, social, amenities and household utilities, land use and natural resources use, municipal territory planning, transport and road economy, accounting, support for innovative development and informatization.

The authority of the Sakrebulo in the field of administrative-territorial organization of the municipality and defining its identity includes:
 Creation and abolition of administrative units in the municipality, change of their borders
 Establishment of local self-government symbols - coat of arms, flag, and other symbols and make changes in them
 establish the rules for the introduction of honorary titles and awards of the self-governing unit and their award
 names of geographical objects, Establishing the rule of the numbering of buildings in the settlements
 Deciding on creating, joining, or leaving a non-profit (non-commercial) legal entity together with other self-governing units.
 approval of the socio-economic development strategy of the self-governing unit
 approval of measures and programs to be taken to attract investments and support innovative development in the territory of the municipality

Election results

The most recent city council election was held on October 2, 2021, and the results were as follows:

! colspan=2| Party
! Lead candidate
! Votes
! %
! +/-
! Seats
! +/-
|-
| bgcolor=#0D00B3| 
| align=left| Georgian Dream
| align=left| Dimitri Mkheidze
| 25,957
| 39.21
|  9.94
| 18
|  1
|-
| bgcolor=#e4012e| 
| align=left| United National Movement 
| align=left| Giga Shushania
| 24,893
| 37.60
|  14.23
| 14
|  10
|-
| bgcolor=#702F92| 
| align=left| For Georgia 
| align=left| Eleonora Archaia
| 4,440
| 6.71
| New
| 2
| New
|-
| bgcolor=#ff0000| 
| align=left| Strategy Aghmashenebeli
| align=left| Koba Guruli
| 2,168
| 3.28
|  0.64
| 1
|  1
|-
| colspan=9 bgcolor=lightgrey| 
|-
| bgcolor=#fad406| 
| align=left| Lelo
| align=left| Gia Gurgenidze
| 1,339
| 2.02
| New
| 0
| New
|-
| bgcolor=#16166b| 
| align=left| Labour Party
| align=left| Samson Gugava
| 1,130
| 1.71
|  2.05
| 0
| 
|-
| bgcolor=#327F37| 
| align=left| Girchi - More Freedom
| align=left| Dachi Dididze
| 1,073
| 1.62
| New
| 0
| New
|-
| bgcolor=#F2721D| 
| align=left|For the People
| align=left| Shota Chikovani
| 820
| 1.24
| New
| 0
| New
|-
| bgcolor=#e7b031| 
| align=left| Alliance of Patriots
| align=left| Nona Asatiani
| 804
| 1.21
|  2.68
| 0
| 
|-
| bgcolor=#003C7B| 
| align=left| European Georgia
| align=left| David Gogisvanidze
| 733
| 1.11
|  10.82
| 0
|  2
|-
! colspan=3| Total
! 68,486
! 100.0
! 
! 35
! ±10 
|-
! colspan=3| Electorate/voter turnout
! 119
! 0.22
!  0.81
! 
! 
|-
| colspan=8| Source: 
|}

Previous election results

2017

! colspan=2| Party
! Votes
! %
! Seats
|-
| bgcolor=| 
| align=left| Georgian Dream
| 25,435
| 49.15
| 19
|-
| bgcolor= #e4012e| 
| align=left| United National Movement 
| 12,091
| 23.37
| 4
|-
| bgcolor= #003876| 
| align=left| European Georgia
| 6,173
| 11.93
| 2
|-
| colspan=5 bgcolor=lightgrey| 
|-
| bgcolor= #e7b031| 
| align=left| Alliance of Patriots
| 2,015
| 3.89
| 0
|-
| bgcolor=| 
| align=left| Labour Party
| 1,944
| 3.76
| 0
|-
| bgcolor= #004a99| 
| align=left| Democratic Movement
| 1,480
| 2.86
| 0
|-
| bgcolor= #ff0000| 
| align=left| Strategy Aghmashenebeli
| 1,365
| 2.64
| 0
|-
! colspan=1| Total
!
! 51,746
! 100.0
! 25 
|-
| colspan=5| Source: 
|}

2014

2010

2006

Council committees

Council Members from 2017-2021

Council Members from electoral districts

Council Members from proportional list

See also 
 Local government in Georgia (country)

Explanatory notes

References

City assemblies in Georgia (country)
Kutaisi